The  is the main residence of the Emperor of Japan, located in the Fukiage Garden on the grounds of the Tokyo Imperial Palace.

Building structure and role 
Designed by Shōzō Uchii, it was completed in 1993 at a cost of  billion (US$52 million, equivalent to US$ million in ). It consists of sixty-two rooms spread over three floors, including a basement level.

It has three main wings:

 A wing of thirty-two office rooms on the northern side.
 A wing dedicated to guest receptions on the southern side, consisting of eleven rooms.

Official name 
In accordance with the imperial naming conventions, it was renamed  when Akihito abdicated on 30 April 2019. Akihito left the palace on March 31, 2020. Naruhito moved in in September 2021.

References

External links 
 Imperial Household Agency site, with a few pictures of the palace
 Additional pictures of the palace

Imperial residences in Japan
Palaces in Tokyo